Roja Chamankar, born 20 May 1981 in Borazjan, Bushehr Province, Iran, in southern Iran, is a Persian poet.

She was born two years after the 1979 Iranian Revolution, studied Literature and Cinema in Tehran, and her PhD in Persian Literature is in Strasbourg. She participated in a number of international poetry festivals, including the Poetry Biennial Val-de-Marne in 2005 and the Voix vives de Méditerranée en Méditerranée festival in Sète in 2013.

Her poems have been published in various Iranian magazines and newspapers. She  has also directed a film and has presented children's television programmes in Iran.

Published works 
 You've Gone, Bring Me Some South
 Nine Months Stones
 Escape My Lips from the Roof
 Dying in a Mother Tongue

References

External links

20th-century Iranian poets
1981 births
Living people
People from Borazjan
Iranian Writers Association members
21st-century Iranian poets